Cantaniño cuenta un cuento is a 1979 musical comedy film directed by Mario David and starring Berugo Carámbula, Mario Pasik, and Mónica Vehil.

Cast 
 Berugo Carámbula 
 Gachi Ferrari as Llí
 Mario Pasik as Alfredo
 Mónica Vehil as Lucrecia
 Javier Portales as Don Roberto Sacote
 Juan Carlos de Seta as Inspector
 Pablo Cumo
 Rina Morán
 Coro Sapito de Oro
 La Mona Margarita
 Virginia Faiad as Maestro
 Mario Luciani
 Rodolfo Onetto
 Sergio Corona
 Carlos Romero
 Juan Carlos Fontana (II)
 Alfredo Pérez
 Adriana Salgueiro as Azafata
 Alfredo Quesada
 Ricardo Suñé
 Claudio España
 Adolfo Castelo
 Nicolás Scarpino
 Mangacha Gutiérrez

External links 
 

1979 films
1970s Spanish-language films
Films directed by Mario David
1970s musical comedy films
Argentine musical comedy films
1970s Argentine films